Brother Is to Son is the sixth full-length album by New Jersey indie rock band Brother Danielson.

Track listing
 "Things Against Stuff"
 "Cookin’ Mid-County"
 "Animal in Every Corner"
 "Daughters Will Tune You"
 "Our Givest"
 "Sweet Sweeps"
 "Perennial Wine"
 "Hammers Sitting Still"
 "Physician Heal Yourself"
 "Brother: Son"

References

2004 albums
Danielson albums
Secretly Canadian albums